Abinash Saha (born 23 May 1992) is an Indian cricketer. He made his first-class debut for Odisha in the 2016–17 Ranji Trophy on 13 November 2016.

References

External links
 

1992 births
Living people
Indian cricketers
Odisha cricketers
People from Cuttack
Cricketers from Odisha